The Rakshan River rises at the Nidoki pass, south-west of Shireza, district Washuk, Balochistan, Pakistan.

Geography 
It is known there as Nag river and runs south-westward. It unites with the lop stream at a point to west of Nag-e-Kalat. It then flows west-south-west through the centre of the long valley which in its centre contains Panjgur city, Makran.  Parallel with the river also run the Siahan Range in the north and the Zangi Lak hills in the south. At its start, the Rakshan possesses little or no water, however, in Panjgur it expands into a series of bright clear pools (kor joh) connected with each other by small water channels running over a pebbly bed. The banks here are bordered with numerous date palms and most of the water is used for irrigation. To the west of Kallag, the last village in Panjgur is Dabbag, where there are more pools and many long grass, tamarisk and kahur trees in which wild pigs were to be found in the early 20th century.

Tributaries
The only considerable tributaries joining the river west of Panjgur are the Mazan Dashtuk from the west, the Askani from the east, and the Gwargo from the south. After traversing Panjgur, the main stream turns northward and joins the Mashkel River from Kuhak on the Iranian side just south of the point where it bursts through the Koh-e-Sabz range by the Tank-e-Grawag or Grawag defile.

The Mashkel River crosses the Siahan Range at Tank-e-Zurrati and runs along the western side of Kharan to the Hamun-i-Mashkel, the total length from the source of the Rakshan being 258 miles.

Physical features
Through a considerable water course, the banks of the Rakshan are low, shelving and irregular, consisting of hard clay known as kork in the Balochi language. The river carries high floods, but owing to its breadth they never do much harm. The bed contains a little tamarisk or grass to relieve the monotony of the barren region which it traverses. Though the river is easy to cross, dangerous quicksands exist in some places.

Sixteenth-century dam
There are remains of a 16th century dam close to Bonistan village which is known as Band-e-Gillar. However no considerable research or historic evidence is available to determine how the people built the dam and how was the water used downstreams.

References

Rivers of Balochistan (Pakistan)
Washuk District
Rivers of Pakistan